ABS-CBN (an initialism of its two predecessors' names, Alto Broadcasting System and Chronicle Broadcasting Network) is a Philippine commercial broadcast network that serves as the flagship property of the ABS-CBN Corporation, a company under Lopez Holdings Corporation owned by the López family. The network is headquartered at the ELJ Communications Center and ABS-CBN Broadcasting Center in Quezon City, with additional offices and production facilities in 25 major cities including Baguio, Naga, Bacolod, Iloilo, Cebu, Davao, and Bulacan, where ABS-CBN's production and post-production facility in Horizon IT Park is located. ABS-CBN is colloquially referred to as the Kapamilya Network; its brand was originally introduced in 1999 and was officially introduced in 2003 during the celebration of its 50th anniversary, and was used until its May 5, 2020, shutdown when the network was renamed Kapamilya Forever in support for the network's franchise renewal on May 13, 2020. ABS-CBN is the largest media company in the country and oldest television broadcaster in Southeast Asia.

ABS-CBN is the first television network in Southeast Asia to broadcast in color, and one of the oldest commercial television broadcasters in Asia. It has also been the leading television network in the Philippines with advertising revenues of 21.2 billion pesos for the 2015 fiscal year. Throughout 2020, ABS-CBN suffered legal challenges which resulted in the loss of the network's broadcast franchise and the ability to broadcast on terrestrial television and radio.

Since the shutdown, the network has rebranded itself as a mass content company and produced television programs, films and other entertainment content through partnerships with independent production companies and broadcasters, including A2Z and TV5. The network's social media accounts are mainly managed by ABS-CBN Digital Media, which have an estimated less than 100 million followers across multiple social media websites. The network's entertainment YouTube channel is the most-subscribed and most-viewed channel in Southeast Asia, with over 36.7 million subscribers and over 44.1 billion views, ahead of Thailand's WorkpointTV.

History

Bolinao Electronics Corporation (BEC) was founded on June 13, 1946. It was established by James Lindenberg, one of the founding fathers of Philippine television and an American electronics engineer who went into radio equipment assembly and radio broadcasting. At the time, the largest media company was the Manila Broadcasting Company, with DZRH as the leading radio station. In 1949, James Lindenberg shifted Bolinao to radio broadcasting with DZBC and planned the introduction of television to the Philippines in 1953.

In 1951, Lindenberg partnered with Antonio Quirino, brother of then-Philippine president Elpidio Quirino, to try television broadcasting. In 1952, BEC was renamed Alto Broadcasting System or ABS (with Alto Sales Corporation as its corporate name). Alto was a contraction of Quirino's and his wife's first names, Tony and Aleli. Despite little money and resources, ABS was able to put up its TV tower by July 1953 and imported around 300 television sets. The initial test broadcasts began in September of the same year. The very first full-blown broadcast was on October 23, 1953, at a party in Quirino's home. The first program to air was a garden party at the Quirino residence in Sitio Alto, San Juan. After the premiere telecast, the station followed a daily four-hour schedule from 6:00 to 10:00 PM.

ABS-CBN's first television broadcast was on October 23, 1953, as Alto Broadcasting System (ABS) on DZAQ-TV, three months after the first broadcast of Japan's NHK General TV and Nippon Television. It is the first television network in Southeast Asia to broadcast in color, the first television network in the Philippines to formally launch a digital terrestrial television service, and the first broadcast television network in the Philippines to formally launch in HD.

The flagship television station of ABS-CBN was DWWX-TV (ABS-CBN TV-2 Manila). As such, the network was informally referred to as "Channel 2" or "dos" (Spanish for two) even if the network was seen in other channel numbers elsewhere in the country. The network operated across the Philippine archipelago through the ABS-CBN Regional division which controlled 80 television stations. Its programs are also available outside the Philippines through the global subscription television channel The Filipino Channel (TFC). From 2011 to 2020, the network had been on test broadcast for digital terrestrial television using the Japanese standard ISDB-T in select areas in the Philippines. On October 3, 2015, ABS-CBN started to broadcast in high-definition quality through its affiliate direct-to-home cable and satellite television providers.

Branding

The ABS-CBN logo features three main elements: the vertical line rooted in a horizontal origin, the three extending circles, and the text ABS-CBN.

ABS-CBN's logo also has a horizontal version, usually used to save space as the main vertical logo usually takes up more space. The design of the horizontal version of the logo contains the ABS-CBN text, split into two parts, "ABS" and "CBN", without the dash connecting them, and ABS-CBN's iconic symbol squeezed in between them.

The first logo to have a horizontal version going by this design was the logo launched in 1986. From 1986 up until 2014, the elements of the horizontal logo, text, and symbol were evenly sized. In the 2014 version of the horizontal logo was slightly larger than the Alto Broadcasting System (ABS) and Chronicle Broadcasting Network (CBN) names.

Programming

ABS-CBN Regional

ABS-CBN Regional (formerly ABS-CBN Regional Network Group) served as the regional network division of ABS-CBN. It was responsible for simultaneously airing most of the shows seen on ABS-CBN's flagship station in the provinces, with all stations (including Cebu, Bacolod and Davao) reopening in 1988 after suspension due to martial law enacted in September 1972. Manila's flagship station reopened after the People Power Revolution in September 1986. ABS-CBN Regional had several stations in each region outside Mega Manila to ensure nationwide coverage.

The local stations also produced their own newscasts which air prior to TV Patrol and another local programming which air on Sundays. The launch of the local game show Kapamilya Winner Ka! (now renamed as Kapamilya, Mas Winner Ka!) in the Visayas and Mindanao, Bagong Morning Kapamilya in North Luzon (Baguio and Dagupan), the 17th local TV Patrol in Southern Tagalog (Region IV-A), and the 18th local TV Patrol in Palawan (IV-B; the network had an affiliate station) provided more relevance to regional audiences.

On April 15, 2011, Regional launched Choose Philippines, a new website promoting tourism in the Philippines by sharing photos and stories of the most extravagant places, culture and arts.

ABS-CBN Regional ceased its operations on August 28, 2020, after almost 32 years following the denial of its legislative franchise on July 10.

Competition
In 1992, AGB Nielsen Philippines was founded. In 2007, TNS Philippines started to offer media research through Kantar Media Philippines (formerly Kantar/TNS). In 2008, AGB Nielsen Philippines released the list of all-time highest rating shows in the Philippines, with 7 of the top 10 highest rating shows all from ABS-CBN with the shows like The Battle: Pacquiao vs. Morales, Rosalinda, Esperanza, Meteor Garden, Pangako Sa 'Yo, Miss Universe 1994, and Maria Mercedes.

Controversies and scandals

Throughout the years, ABS-CBN has been involved in several controversies and scandals involving its talents, employees, and programs.

2004 copyright infringement with GMA
On July 22, 2004, during the arrival of Angelo de la Cruz (a truck driver who was held hostage and threatened with beheading in Iraq abducted by armed rebels west of Baghdad while trucking fuel from Saudi Arabia) at Ninoy Aquino International Airport, live breaking news coverage was aired on GMA Network and other television stations in the Philippines. GMA Network used audio-video coverage from Reuters, which the network was subscribed to. During the broadcast, a live feed from Reuters was simultaneously aired with its own live broadcast. During the first five seconds of the live feed, GMA Network noticed that the live feed from Reuters was also airing from its main competitor ABS-CBN. The live video was restricted only to ABS-CBN and Reuters did not inform GMA Network that the video coverage was only intended for ABS-CBN. The local Court of Appeals declined the case filed by ABS-CBN Corporation against GMA Network Inc. for allegations of illegal duplication of its live video footage. In a ruling, the local fourth division of the appellate court set aside the resolution of the local Justice Department, which approved the filing of the violation of Republic Act 8293 (or the Intellectual Property Code) against GMA Network. It ruled out that the act of GMA Network airing the live video coverage was focused on good faith since there was no intent to instigate damage to ABS-CBN. The local court also said GMA Network acted in good faith when it immediately stopped using the live video feed from Reuters upon learning ABS-CBN was also covering the event and its following exertion to authenticate the ABS-CBN Corporation restriction arrangement with the news service, Reuters. The court also stressed that apart from the lack of intent of GMA Network to affect the video from ABS-CBN, the action did not contravene Sections 212.4 and 185.1 of Republic Act 8293 since it was a short excerpt.

Wowowee scandals and incidents

Two major incidents involving ABS-CBN have involved the network's variety show Wowowee. The first incident was a demand for tickets to a one-year anniversary episode of the show at the PhilSports Arena in 2006 caused a deadly stampede killing 76 people. Over a year later in August 2007, the show became entrenched in another scandal involving the possibility of a new game on the show being rigged as evident by a "mechanical glitch" which occurred during an episode, which grew greater after Eat Bulaga! host Joey de Leon and Wowowee host Willie Revillame started exchanging attacks on-air against each other during their respective and competing shows. The incident later led to a probe by the Department of Trade and Industry led by senator Mar Roxas (which was jokingly suggested by Joey during a speech he made on Eat Bulaga! in reference to the Hello Garci scandal, dubbing it "Hello Pappy").

AGB Nielsen TV ratings scandal

In late 2007, ABS-CBN and GMA Network accused AGB Nielsen Philippines of tampering with the ratings during their 2007 ratings surveys.

ABS-CBN vs. Willing Willie copyright case
ABS-CBN demanded  from their former reality show star, Willie Revillame, citing copyright infringement due to stark similarities in Revillame's show, Willing Willie on TV5, and ABS-CBN's Wowowee. ABS-CBN listed five acts of plagiarism allegedly committed by Willing Willie in their complaint as follows:
Willing Willies opening song and dance number was similar to that of Wowowee's
"BIGA-Ten" and "Big Time Ka", both segments from the shows involved, bear similar names
"Willie of Fortune" and "Willtime Bigtime" are segments from both shows which resemble each other. ABS-CBN claimed that Willtime Bigtime resembled its show as it also showcases contestants relaying their personal stories before proceeding to play a singing/trivia game.
April "Congratulations" Gustilo was one of several backup dancers from Wowowee who also appear in Willing Willie.
Other striking similarities ABS-CBN claimed are found in Willing Willies set design, stage, studio viewers' seats lay-out, lighting angles and camera angles. 
A 25-page ruling dated May 22, 2015, dismissed the case against Revillame. After the Quezon City RTC demanded a  bond from Revillame to answer any further damage the network might sustain, the fee was waived.

2020 franchise renewal controversy

Since April 2017, ABS-CBN was attacked by the president, Rodrigo Duterte, as the network refused to air his 2016 presidential campaign ads in favor of a smear ad paid for by-then vice presidential candidate Antonio Trillanes. However, according to the country's Commission on Elections spokesperson James Jimenez, the controversial ad was within election law, under "Partisan Political Activity". Duterte publicly stated that he would oppose the 25-year franchise renewal of ABS-CBN, and former Laguna governor E.R. Ejercito supported his plan. Opposition lawmakers as well as labor groups objected to Duterte's stance on ABS-CBN, as the franchise's non-renewal would compromise the employees of the network; stating that the blocking of the franchise renewal had no merit. Opposition groups also claimed that the non-renewal of the franchise violates press freedom.

Under Philippine law, broadcasting networks require a congressional franchise (Republic Act) to operate television and radio stations for 25 years; the absence of one will lead to the suspension of its operations. ABS-CBN's legislative franchise, which was approved by the virtue of Republic Act No. 7966 (granted last March 30, 1995), was scheduled to expire on May 4, 2020, because the franchise will become effective fifteen days after its publication on the Official Gazette on April 19, 1995. At least 12 lawmakers have filed their own versions for a new franchise of the network. House Speaker Alan Peter Cayetano assured that Congress will tackle the franchise with fairness.

On February 24, 2020, the CEO of the network apologized to Duterte for not airing his political advertisements during his 2016 polls, which Duterte accepted, and Congress made its decision to investigate their franchise renewal.

During a Senate hearing on the same day, public services panel chair Grace Poe stated they were to investigate ABS-CBN's compliance with the terms and conditions of its franchise. The Senate concluded that there was no breach of laws or franchise terms.

On May 5, 2020, the National Telecommunications Commission issued a cease and desist order to stop the network's broadcast, including its radio stations DZMM and MOR, following the expiration of its broadcast franchise the day before. The cease and desist order covers 42 television stations operated by ABS-CBN across the country, including Channel 2, 10 digital broadcast channels, 18 FM stations, and 5 AM stations.

The network subsequently signed off following TV Patrol. Along with the order, NTC wanted to recall ABS-CBN's assigned frequencies. ABS-CBN explained that it would not be in public interest to have the frequencies recalled, as this would hinder their ability to immediately restart broadcasts in the event a new franchise was granted. Additionally, there were fresh measures in the Congress to grant provisional franchise, which later rolled into a series of hearings to grant a fresh 25-year franchise. NTC was told to refrain from carrying out the recall by the Congress. On July 10, 2020, members of the House of Representatives, voted 70–11 to deny ABS-CBN's franchise application, citing several issues on the network's franchise. According to a survey released by the Social Weather Stations following the rejection of the network's franchise renewal, 75% of Filipinos want the network back.

Notes

References

External links

Media Ownership Monitor Philippines – Television by Vera Files and Reporters Without Borders

1953 establishments in the Philippines
 
Companies based in Quezon City
Digital terrestrial television in the Philippines
Filipino-language television stations
Mass media companies of the Philippines
Television networks in the Philippines
Television channels and stations established in 1953
Television in Metro Manila
ABS-CBN Corporation channels